Carol Tomcala (born 22 November 1954) is an Australian sports shooter. She competed in two events at the 1996 Summer Olympics.

References 

1954 births
Living people
Australian female sport shooters
Olympic shooters of Australia
Shooters at the 1996 Summer Olympics
20th-century Australian women
21st-century Australian women